"Little Guitars" is a song performed by Van Halen. It was included on their album Diver Down.

The song is notable for its intro, an acoustic flamenco-style solo by Eddie Van Halen. This was accomplished by using his right hand to pick a single-note trill on the high E string. He then used his left hand to play the melody on the A and D strings using hammer-ons and pull-offs.

In addition to the intro, the song is also notable for the mini-Les Paul guitar (the so-called "little guitar") that Edward used for the main track. This is the only Van Halen recording that the guitar was used for. The mini-Les Paul was made by Nashville luthier David Petschulat, and was pitched and sold to Eddie during a tour stop in Nashville, Tennessee. Eddie purchased a second mini-LP guitar that was then built to slightly different specs; the first being a honey-sunburst with mini-humbuckers, and the second being dark wine-red with a thicker body and full-size humbuckers.

Chuck Klosterman of Vulture.com ranked it the 18th-best Van Halen song, writing "Nothing is heavy, everything is edifying — a comprehensive success."

References

Van Halen songs
Song recordings produced by Ted Templeman
1982 songs
Songs written by Michael Anthony (musician)
Songs written by David Lee Roth
Songs written by Alex Van Halen
Songs written by Eddie Van Halen
1982 singles
Warner Records singles
American hard rock songs